Sky Acres Airport  is a public-use airport located six miles (10 km) southwest of the central business district of Millbrook, a village in Dutchess County, New York, United States. It is privately owned by Sky Acres Enterprises, Inc.

Facilities and aircraft 
For the 12-month period ending September 15, 2005, the airport had 48,300 aircraft operations, an average of 132 per day: 99% general aviation and 1% military. There are 95 aircraft based at this airport: 82% single-engine and 18% multi-engine.

Accidents
On August 17, 2019, a Cessna 303 plane that was descending into the airport crashed into a private home resulting in the death of the pilot, Francisco Knipping Diaz, a Dominican American attorney from Manhattan and local homeowner Gerard "Jerry" Bocker.

References

External links 

Airports in New York (state)
Transportation buildings and structures in Dutchess County, New York